List of Guggenheim Fellowships awarded in 2007.

2007 U.S. and Canadian Fellows

 Daniel Alarcón, Writer, Oakland, California; Distinguished Visiting Writer, Mills College: Fiction.
 Rick Altman, Professor of Cinema and Comparative Literature, University of Iowa: Classical Hollywood sound.
 Warwick Anderson, Robert Turell Professor of Medical History and Population Health, University of Wisconsin, Madison: The science of race mixing in the twentieth century.
 Shawn Atkins, Animation Filmmaker, House of Frame by Frame Fierce, Inc: Film animation.
 SoHyun Bae, Artist, New York City and Bologna, Italy: Visual arts.
 William Baer, Professor of English, University of Evansville: The sonnets of Bocage.
 Rennan Barkana, Senior Lecturer, School of Astronomy and Physics, Tel Aviv University: Gas and stars in the early universe.
 Shadi Bartsch, Ann L. and Lawrence B. Buttenwieser Professor of Classics, University of Chicago: Philosophy and the figural in antiquity.
 David A. Baum, Professor of Botany, University of Wisconsin, Madison: Applying phylogenetics to problems in evolution and evolutionary education.
 Timothy Beach, Associate Professor of Geography, School of Foreign Service Program in Science, Technology, and International Affairs, Georgetown University: Environmental history of the Maya lowlands.
 Daphne Berdahl, Associate Professor of Anthropology and Global Studies, University of Minnesota: Citizenship and mass consumption in post-wall Germany.
 Domenico Bertoloni Meli, Professor of the History and Philosophy of Science, Indiana University: Marcello Malpighi and mechanistic medicine.
 Edmund Bertschinger, Professor of Physics, Massachusetts Institute of Technology: Physics of the cosmic microwave background.
 Eric R. Bittner, Associate Professor of Chemistry, University of Houston: Quantum dynamics in molecular electronic devices.
 Hisham M. Bizri, Assistant Professor of Cultural Studies and Comparative Literature, University of Minnesota: Filmmaking.
 Jane Ira Bloom, Composer, New York City; Associate Professor of Jazz and Contemporary Music, New School University: Music composition.
 Lawrence D. Bobo, Martin Luther King, Jr., Centennial Professor, and Director, Center for Comparative Studies in Race and Ethnicity, Stanford University: Black and white Americans' views of the new law and order regime.
 Rosalyn Bodycomb, Artist, Long Island City, New York: Painting.
 Jennifer Bolande, Artist, Joshua Tree, California; Professor of New Genres, Department of Art, University of California, Los Angeles: Fine arts.
 Robert Bordo, Artist, Valatie, New York; Associate Professor of Art, Cooper Union School of Art: Painting.
 Catherine Anne Brekus, Associate Professor, University of Chicago Divinity School: Evangelicalism and the Enlightenment in 18th-century America.
 Jeffrey F. Brock, Associate Professor of Mathematics, Brown University: Models, bounds, and effective rigidity in hyperbolic geometry.
 Kevin Brockmeier, Writer, Little Rock, Arkansas: Fiction.
 Elizabeth Brown, Composer and Performer, Brooklyn, New York: Music composition.
 Jane Brox, Writer, Brunswick, Maine; Nonfiction Writing Faculty Member, Low Residency MFA Program, Lesley University: A history of controlled light.
 Christopher Buckley, Poet, Lompoc, California; Professor, Department of Creative Writing, University of California, Riverside: Poetry.
 Alan Burdick, Writer, Hastings-on-Hudson, New York: About the biology of time.
 Don Byron, Composer, Boiceville, New York; Visiting Associate Professor, The University at Albany: Music composition.
 Daniel Carpenter, Professor of Government, and Director, Center for American Political Studies, Harvard University: The American antislavery petition in context.
 Cynthia Carr, Writer, New York City: The life of David Wojnarowicz.
 Natalie Charkow Hollander, Sculptor, Woodbridge, Connecticut: Sculpture.
 Bruce Charlesworth, Video Artist, Murpysboro, Illinois; Adjunct Professor of Cinema and Photography, Southern Illinois University: Video-based installation.
 Chris Lan Hui Chou, Artist, Allston, Massachusetts: Painting.
 Nikos Chrisochoides, Alumni Memorial Distinguished Associate Professor, College of William and Mary: Medical image analysis.
 James Clifford, Professor, History of Consciousness Department, University of California, Santa Cruz: Indigenous cultural politics today.
 Richard Conniff, Writer, Old Lyme, Connecticut: Discovering life on a little-known planet.
 Margaret Crawford, Professor of Urban Design and Planning Theory, Graduate School of Design, Harvard University: Rethinking urban space.
 Thomas James Dandelet, Associate Professor of History, University of California, Berkeley: The Colonna of Rome, 1500-1700.
 Diana K. Davis, Assistant Professor of Geography and Middle Eastern Studies, University of Texas, Austin: Imperialism and environmental history in the Middle East.
 Greg Delanty, Poet, Burlington, Vermont; Assistant Professor of English and Artist-in-residence, St. Michael's College: Poetry.
 Fred M. Donner, Professor of Near Eastern History, Department of Near Eastern Languages and Civilizations, and The Oriental Institute, The University of Chicago: Early Islamic political vocabulary.
 Paquito D'Rivera, Composer, North Bergen, New Jersey: Music composition.
 Mary L. Dudziak, Judge Edward J. and Ruey L. Guirado Professor of Law, History, and Political Science, University of Southern California: How war made America in the 20th century.
 David Dzubay, Composer, Bloomington, Indiana; Professor of Music, and Director, New Music Ensemble, Indiana University: Music composition.
 Debra Magpie Earling, Writer, Missoula, Montana; Associate Professor of English and Creative Writing, University of Montana: Fiction.
 Rinde Eckert, Composer, Nyack, New York: Music composition.
 Kenneth Eng, Filmmaker, Brooklyn, New York; Film Director and Editor, Projectile Arts, Inc: Film.
 Steve Erickson, Writer, Topanga Canyon, California; Instructor, California Institute of the Arts: Fiction.
 W. Ralph Eubanks, Director of Publishing, Library of Congress: A story of race, reconciliation, and identity.
 Sidra DeKoven Ezrahi, Professor of Comparative Jewish Literature, Institute of Contemporary Jewry, Hebrew University of Jerusalem: Jerusalem and the poetics of return.
 Heide Fehrenbach, Professor of History, Northern Illinois University: How World War II remade the family.
 William Ferris, Joel R. Williamson Eminent Professor of History, University of North Carolina, Chapel Hill: Voices and roots: Mississippi blues.
 Maria Flook, Writer, Truro, Massachusetts; Distinguished Writer-in-residence, Emerson College; Fiction Faculty Member, Fine Arts Work Center, Provincetown, Massachusetts: Fiction.
 Michael P. Flynn, Associate Professor, Department of Electrical Engineering and Computer Science, University of Michigan: The fundamental limits of analog-to-digital conversion.
 Neil Foley, Associate Professor of History, University of Texas, Austin: Civil rights in Texas and the Southwest, 1940-1965.
 Ed Folsom, Roy J. Carver Professor of English, University of Iowa: A biography of Walt Whitman's Leaves of Grass.
 David Frankfurter, Professor of Religious Studies and History, University of New Hampshire: Christianization in late antique Egypt.
 Erica Funkhouser, Poet, Essex, Massachusetts; Lecturer, Department of Writing and Humanistic Studies, Massachusetts Institute of Technology: Poetry.
 Ann Gale, Artist, Seattle, Washington; Associate Professor, School of Art, University of Washington: Painting.
 Enrique García Santo-Tomás, Associate Professor of Spanish, University of Michigan: Fictions by war veterans in early modern Spanish literature, 1550-1680.
 Mark Gertler, Henry and Lucy Moses Professor of Economics, New York University: The international dimensions of monetary policy.
 J. Arch Getty, Professor of History, University of California, Los Angeles: Folkways, political practices, and the Soviet state.
 Melissa James Gibson, Playwright, Brooklyn, New York; College Counselor, Saint Ann's School: The architecture of memory.
 Michel X. Goemans, Professor of Applied Mathematics, Massachusetts Institute of Technology: The traveling salesman problem.
 Bob Goldstein, Associate Professor of Biology, University of North Carolina, Chapel Hill: Cell interactions in the asymmetric division of stem cells.
 Michael Goldstein, Professor of Mathematics, University of Toronto: Anderson localization of Eigen functions.
 Joe Goode, Choreographer, Berkeley, California; Artistic Director, Joe Goode Performance Group; Professor, Department of Theater, Dance, and Performance Studies, University of California, Berkeley: Choreography.
 Michael Gorra, Mary Augusta Jordan Professor of English, Smith College: A study of Henry James.
 Robert J. Griffin, Associate Professor of English, Texas A & M University: Anonymity and authorship.
 Mary Hambleton, Artist, Brooklyn, New York; Adjunct Assistant Professor of Fine Arts, Parsons The New School for Design, New School University: Painting.
 Susan Ashbrook Harvey, Professor of Religious Studies, Brown University: Biblical women and women's choirs in Syriac tradition.
 Arjun M. Heimsath, Assistant Professor, Department of Earth Sciences, Dartmouth College: Soil erosion and sustainability.
 Carola Hein, Associate Professor and Acting Chair, Growth and Structure of Cities Program: The global architecture of oil.
 Gail Hershatter, Professor of History, University of California, Santa Cruz: Rural women and China's collective past.
 John Hollenbeck, Composer, New York City: Music composition.
 Paul Horwich, Professor of Philosophy, New York University: Wittgenstein's metaphilosophy.
 Brett R. Ingram, Filmmaker, Greensboro, North Carolina; Assistant Professor of Broadcasting and Cinema, University of North Carolina, Greensboro: Film.
 Jim Jennings, Filmmaker, Long Island City, New York: Film.
 Fenton Johnson, Writer, Tucson, Arizona; Associate Professor, Creative Writing Program, University of Arizona: Desire in Solitude (nonfiction).
 A. Van Jordan, Poet, Austin, Texas; Assistant Professor of English, University of Texas, Austin: Poetry.
 Heidi Julavits, Writer, New York City: Fiction.
 Stathis N. Kalyvas, Arnold Wolfers Professor of Political Science, and Director, Program on Order, Conflict, and Violence, Yale University: Varieties of political violence.
 Kathryn Kerby-Fulton, The Notre Dame Professor of English, Notre Dame University: Professional reading circles and the rise of English literature.
 Sanjeev Khanna, Professor of Computer and Information Science, University of Pennsylvania: Cuts, flows, and network routing.
 Dina Rizk Khoury, Associate Professor of History and International Affairs, and Director, Graduate Studies, George Washington University: War and remembrance in Iraq.
 Verlyn Klinkenborg, Writer, The New York Times: The radical essence of William Cobbett.
 Koosil-ja, Artistic Director and Choreographer, Dansology, Inc. koosil-ja/danceKUMIKO, New York City: Choreography.
 Paul W. Kroll, Professor of Chinese, University of Colorado: A study of High Tang verse.
 Tania León, Composer, Nyack, New York; Distinguished Professor, Brooklyn College of the City University of New York: Music composition.
 Dana Levin, Poet, Santa Fe, New Mexico; Associate Professor of Creative Writing and Literature, College of Santa Fe (now Santa Fe University of Art and Design): Poetry.
 Philippa Levine, Professor of History, University of Southern California: The evolution debates.
 Michael Light, Artist, San Francisco, California: Photography.
 Meredith Parsons Lillich, Professor of Fine Arts, Syracuse University: The Gothic stained glass of Reims Cathedral.
 Kalup Linzy, Artist, Brooklyn, New York: Video.
 Peter D. Little, Professor and Chair, Department of Anthropology, University of Kentucky: The anthropology of neoliberalism in sub-Saharan Africa.
 Alan Loehle, Artist, Decatur, Georgia; Associate Professor of Studio Art, Oglethorpe University: Painting.
 Pamela O. Long, Independent Historian; Visiting Professor, Bard Graduate Center, New York City: Engineering, power, and knowledge in Rome, 1560-1590.
 Margaretta M. Lovell, Professor of Art History, University of California, Berkeley: Fitz H. Lane and Winslow Homer.
 Tanya Luhrmann, Professor of Anthropology, Stanford University: Making God real in evangelical Christianity.
 Arthur Lupia, Hal R. Varian Collegiate Professor of Political Science, University of Michigan: Political knowledge and the practice of civic education.
 Rudresh K. Mahanthappa, Composer, Brooklyn, New York; Adjunct Private Lesson Instructor, Rye Country Day School: Music composition.
 Gary J. Marker, Professor of History, State University of New York, Stony Brook: The idea of "Russia" in clerical discourse.
 Michael McCann, Gordon Hirabayashi Professor for the Advancement of Citizenship, University of Washington: Public interest litigation and the politics of responsibility.
 Dianne McIntyre, Choreographer, Cleveland: Choreography.
 Peter H. McMurry, Professor of Mechanical Engineering, University of Minnesota: New particle formation and growth rates in the atmosphere.
 Suketu Mehta, Writer, Cliffside Park, New Jersey: A nonfiction book on New York.
 Roberto Merlin, Professor of Physics and of Electrical Engineering and Computer Science, University of Michigan: Sub-nanometer imaging with sub-picosecond resolution.
 Piotr Michałowski, George G. Cameron Professor of Ancient Near Eastern Civilizations, University of Michigan: The cyclical birth and rebirth of early Mesopotamian literature.
 Jerry Xhelal Mitrovica, Professor of Physics, University of Toronto: Polar wander and the long-term evolution of Earth.
 Paul G. Molyneaux, Journalist and Writer, Whiting, Maine: Charting the course to sustainable seafood.
 Malena Mörling, Poet, Wrightsville Beach, North Carolina; Assistant Professor of Poetry, University of North Carolina, Wilmington: Poetry.
 Bradford Morrow, Writer, New York City; Professor of Literature and Bard Center Fellow, Bard College: Fiction.
 Naeem Murr, Writer, Chicago: Fiction.
 Sabina Murray, Writer, Amherst, Massachusetts; Associate Professor of English, MFA Program, University of Massachusetts, Amherst: Fiction.
 Peter Nabokov, Professor, Department of American Indian Studies and World Arts and Cultures, University of California, Los Angeles: The passages of Edward Proctor Hunt.
 Erika Naginski, Associate Professor of Architecture, Massachusetts Institute of Technology: Architecture, the graphic arts, and the philosophy of history in the 18th century.
 Sara Tilghman Nalle, Professor of History, William Paterson University: A new history of the Spanish family, 1520-1720.
 Victor Nee, Goldwin Smith Professor of Sociology, Cornell University: Market transition and politicized capitalism.
 J. David Neelin, Professor, Department of Atmospheric and Oceanic Sciences and Institute of Geophysics and Planetary Physics, University of California, Los Angeles: Rethinking rain in climate models.
 Samuel Nigro, Artist, Brooklyn, New York: Sculpture.
 D. Nurkse, Poet, Brooklyn, New York; Professor, Graduate Writing Program, Sarah Lawrence College: Poetry.
 Karyn Andrea Olivier, Artist, Brooklyn, New York; Assistant Professor, Tyler School of Art, Temple University: Installation art.
 Sarah Oppenheimer, Artist, New York City; Assistant Professor, Yale University School of Art: Installation art.
 Annie-B Parson, Choreographer, Brooklyn, New York; Artistic Director, Big Dance Theater; Instructor in Choreography, Tisch School of the Arts, New York University: Choreography.
 Andrew H. Paterson, Distinguished Research Professor, University of Georgia: Unraveling structural and functional divergence of cereal genomes.
 Doug Peacock, Writer, Green Valley, Arizona, and Livingston, Montana: Repatriation.
 Kathleen Peirce, Poet, Wimberley, Texas; Professor of English, Texas State University: Poetry.
 Michael Philip Penn, Assistant Professor of Religion and of Gender Studies, Mount Holyoke College: Syriac Christian reactions to the Islamic conquests.
 Peter Pesic, Tutor and Musician-in-residence, St. John's College, Santa Fe: Connections between music and natural philosophy.
 Julie Stone Peters, Professor of English and Comparative Literature, Columbia University: Theatrical censorship, obscenity, and the making of modern drama.
 Leila Stott Philip, Associate Professor of English and Creative Writing, College of the Holy Cross: A portrait of Toshiko Takaezu.
 Laura Poitras, Documentary Filmmaker, New York City: Film.
 Richard Owen Prum, William Robertson Coe Professor and Curator of Ornithology, Yale University: The biology of feathers.
 Lawrence Raab, Poet, Williamstown, Massachusetts; Morris Professor of Rhetoric, Williams College: Poetry.
 Geraldine L. Richmond, Richard M. and Patricia H. Noyes Professor of Chemistry, University of Oregon: Environmental sustainability.
 Mary Louise Roberts, Professor of History, University of Wisconsin, Madison: The American military presence in France, 1944-1945.
 Daniel T. Rodgers, Henry Charles Lea Professor of History, Princeton University: Transformation in social thought in 1980s America.
 Pej Rohani, Associate Professor, Institute of Ecology, University of Georgia: The ecology and evolution of dengue.
 Richard Ross, Photographer, Santa Barbara, California; Professor of Art, University of California, Santa Barbara: Photography.
 Teofilo F. Ruiz, Professor of History, University of California, Los Angeles: Festivals, rituals, and power in late medieval and early modern Spain.
 Michael L. Satlow, Associate Professor of Religious Studies and Judaic Studies, Brown University: Jewish piety in late antiquity.
 José Alexandre Scheinkman, Theodore Wells '29 Professor of Economics, Princeton University: The economics of the informal sector.
 Michael Scrivener, Professor of English, Wayne State University: Jewish representations in Romantic-era British literature.
 Robert Self, Associate Professor of History, Brown University: Gender and sexuality in America from Watts to Reagan.
 Laurie Shannon, E. Blake Byrne Associate Professor of English, Duke University: Zoographies of knowledge in early modernity.
 Kay Kaufman Shelemay, G. Gordon Watts Professor of Music, and Professor of African and African American Studies, Harvard University: Ethiopian music and musicians in the United States.
 Anne C. Shreffler, James Edward Ditson Professor of Music, Harvard University: New music, avant-garde, and politics in the early Cold War.
 Amie Siegel, Filmmaker, New York City: Film.
 A. Mark Smith, Curators' Professor of History, University of Missouri, Columbia: Alhacen on refraction.
 Nigel Smith, Professor of English, Princeton University: Literary production in early modern Europe, 1500-1700.
 Dava Sobel, Science Writer, East Hampton, New York: Copernicus.
 Elaine Spatz-Rabinowitz, Artist, Cambridge, Massachusetts; Professor of Art, Wellesley College: Painting.
 Dana Spiotta, Writer, Cherry Valley, New York: Fiction.
 Anne Whiston Spirn, Professor of Landscape Architecture and Planning, Massachusetts Institute of Technology: Rebuilding the landscape of community.
 Nick Spitzer, Professor of Folklore and Cultural Conservation, University of New Orleans; Producer, American Routes, Public Radio International: Tradition and creativity in Louisiana Creole communities.
 RoseAnne Spradlin, Choreographer, New York City: Choreography.
 Scott Stark, Filmmaker, Austin, Texas; Associate Information Developer, IBM: Film.
 Mark D. Steinberg, Professor of History, and Editor, Slavic Review, University of Illinois, Urbana-Champaign: Landscapes of the modern in fin de siècle St. Petersburg.
 James Robert Stewart, Artist, Fredonia, Pennsylvania: Painting.
 Raymond Stock, Writer and Arabic-English Translator, Beulah, Michigan: A biography of Naguib Mahfouz.
 Nancy Lynn Sullivan, Independent Researcher, Papua New Guinea; Director and Principal Investigator, Nancy Sullivan & Associates: The cave arts of the upper Karawari in Papua New Guinea.
 Cynthia Talbot, Associate Professor of History and Asian Studies, University of Texas, Austin: Recasting the medieval Indian past.
 Michael J. Tarr, Professor of Cognitive and Linguistic Sciences, and Fox Professor of Ophthalmology and Visual Sciences, Brown University: Statistical models of structural visual object recognition in humans.
 R. Larry Todd, Arts and Sciences Professor of Music, Duke University: The life and music of Fanny Mendelssohn Hensel.
 David Treuer, Associate Professor of English, University of Minnesota: Contemporary reservation life.
 Dmitri Tymoczko, Composer, Princeton, New Jersey; Assistant Professor of Music, Princeton University: Music composition.
 Eric Urban, Professor of Mathematics, Columbia University: P-adic automorphic forms and p-adic L-functions.
 Salil Vadhan, Gordon McKay Professor of Computer Science and Applied Mathematics, Harvard University: The complexity of zero-knowledge proofs.
 David Van Tieghem, Composer, West Hurley, New York: Music composition.
 Lawrence Venuti, Professor of English, Temple University: A translation of Giovanni Pascoli's poetry and prose.
 Jorge M. Vivanco, Director and Associate Professor, Center for Rhizosphere Biology, Colorado State University: Investigations in tropical chemical ecology.
 Michael Wachtel, Professor of Russian Literature, Princeton University: Pushkin's lyric poetry.
 John Walbridge, Professor of Near Eastern Languages and Cultures, Indiana University: Shirazi's synthesis of the philosophical foundations of Galenic medicine.
 Pamela Barnhouse Walters, James H. Rudy Professor of Sociology, Indiana University: Apartheid schooling in America.
 Bernard Wasserstein, Harriet and Ulrich E. Meyer Professor of Modern European Jewish History, University of Chicago: Jewish intellectuals in postwar Europe.
 Andrew Watsky, Associate Professor of Art, Vassar College: Named objects in Momoyama Japan.
 Sandra R. Waxman, Professor of Psychology, Northwestern University: Notions of the natural world.
 Alex Webb, Photographer, Brooklyn, New York: Photography.
 Donald Weber, Photographer, Toronto, Canada: Photography.
 Barbara Weissberger, Artist, Pittsburgh, Pennsylvania; Visiting Lecturer, Studio Arts Department, University of Pittsburgh: Drawing.
 Stephen Westfall, Artist, New York City; Assistant Professor, Mason Gross School of the Arts, Rutgers University; Cochair, Department of Painting, Milton Avery Graduate School of the Arts, Bard College: Painting.
 Jeff Whetstone, Photographer, Durham, North Carolina; Assistant Professor of Art, University of North Carolina, Chapel Hill: Photography.
 David Gordon White, Professor, Department of Religious Studies, University of California, Santa Barbara: The Indian yogi, 200 BC - 2000 CE.
 Tommy White, Artist, New York City; Lecturer, Center for the Creative and Performing Arts, Princeton University: Painting.
 Mark Winey, Professor of Molecular, Cellular, and Developmental Biology, University of Colorado, Boulder: Gene discovery in human ciliary diseases.
 Michele Wucker, Senior Fellow, World Policy Institute, New York City: Evolving views of citizenship, belonging, and exclusion.
 Peter Zandstra, Associate Professor, Institute of Biomaterials and Biomedical Engineering, University of Toronto: Engineering stem cell fate.
 Shoucheng Zhang, Professor of Physics, Stanford University: Quantum spin Hall effect.
 Lisa Zunshine, Associate Professor of English, University of Kentucky: Cognitive science and literary interpretations.

Latin American and Caribbean Fellows

 Leonor Arfuch, Professor, Faculty of Social Sciences, University of Buenos Aires, and Professor of Design and City Planning, City University Pabellón III: Identity, subjectivity, memory: narratives of the recent past.
 Cesar Alfredo Barbero, Associate Professor, National University of Rio Cuarto, and Principal Researcher, CONICET: Development of novel nanomaterials.
 Daniela Broitman, Director and Producer, VideoForum Filmes: Film.
 Marcelo Coglitore, Photographer, Buenos Aires: Photography.
 N. Rubén Cuneo, Independent Researcher, CONICET, and Director, Museo Paleontológico Egidio Feruglio (MEF): The K-T floral transition in the southern hemisphere.
 Saurabh Dube, Professor of History, Center for Asian and African Studies, College of Mexico: Christianity, colonialism, and conversion, 1860-2005.
 Jorge Durand, Professor, University of Guadalajara: Latin American migration and the creation of new identity in the United States.
 Carmen Escalante Gutierrez, Researcher, Centro Bartolomé de Las Casas: Huancauelican oral accounts of violence and authoritarianism in Peru, 1980-2000.
 Darío A. Estrin, Associate Professor, University of Buenos Aires, and Principal Researcher, CONICET: Computer simulation of heme proteins of physiopathological relevance.
 Gustavo Henrique Goldman, Professor of Molecular Biology, FCFRP, University of São Paulo: The filamentous fungus Aspergilius nidulans.
 Patrick Hamilton, Artist, Santiago, Chile, and Professor of Painting, University Diego Portales: Fine arts.
 Anwar Hasmy, Guest Researcher, National Institute of Standards and Technology, and Associate Researcher, Venezuelan Center for Computer Calculations (Cecalcula): Hardness and reactivity of noble metal nanoparticles.
 Antonio López-Ortega, Writer, Caracas, Venezuela, and General Manager, Bigott Foundation: Fiction.
 Patricia Majluf, Director, Center for Environmental Sustainability: Sustainable alternatives to restore marine ecosystems.
 Osvaldo Morrone, Independent Researcher, CONICET, and Subdirector, Instituto de Botánica Darwinion (IBODA): Systematic studies in the genus Paspalum (Poaceae).
 Ramón Elias Mujica Pinilla, President, Sociedad Peruana de Estudios Clásicos: Fine arts research.
 Marcos Novaro, Adjunct Researcher, CONICET, and Adjunct Professor, University of Buenos Aires: Human rights and democratization in Argentina, 1979-2007.
 Ana María Ochoa-Gautier, Associate Professor of Music, New York University: Music, sound, and modernity in Colombia.
 Daniel Ontiveros, Artist, Buenos Aires: Fine arts.
 Ernesto Oroza, Artist, Researcher, and Designer, Aventura, Florida: The architecture of necessity.
 Sergio Raimondi, Poet, Buenos Aires, Adjunct Professor of Contemporary Literature, National University del Sur, Argentina, and Director, Museo del Puerto Ingeniero White: Poetry.
 Gregorio Carlos Rocha, Filmmaker, Morelos, Mexico: Film.
 Marco A. Romano-Silva, Associate Professor of Psychiatry, Federal University of Minas Gerais: Clinical and molecular aspects of bipolar disorder.
 Ruth Rosenstein, Professor of Human Biochemistry, University of Buenos Aires, and Principal Researcher, CONICET: Research on a cure for glaucoma.
 Analia Segal, Artist, Brooklyn, New York: Fine arts.
 Pedro Serrano, Poet, Mexico City, and Lecturer, Faculty of the Humanities, Autonomous University of Mexico: Poetry.
 Sergio Serulnikov, Adjunct Researcher, CONICET: Patricians and plebeians in late colonial Charcas.
 Daniela Spenser, Research Professor, Center for Research and Advanced Studies in Social Anthropology, Mexico City: The life and times of Vicente Lombardo Toledano.
 Laura Beatriz Steren, Independent Researcher, CONICET, and Adjunct Professor, Instituto Balseiro: Spin-polarized transport phenomena in artificial magnetic nanostructures.
 Oscar Strasnoy, Composer, Paris, France: Music composition.
 Perla Suez, Writer, Córdoba, Argentina: Fiction.
 John Joseph Sullivan Hendricks, Research Professor, Autonomous University of Zacatecas: A monolingual Huastecan Nahuatl dictionary.
 Alexey Puig Taran, Choreographer, Caracas, Venezuela: Choreography.
 Aparecida Vilaça, Associate Professor of Social Anthropology, National Museum, Federal University of Rio de Janeiro: Conversion and Christianity in native lowland South America.
 Lila Zemborain, Poet, New York City, and Clinical Professor, Department of Spanish and Portuguese, New York University: Poetry.

See also
Guggenheim Fellowship

References

External links
John Simon Guggenheim Memorial Foundation home page

2007
2007 awards
2007 art awards